Beherit is a Finnish black metal band from Rovaniemi. The band was formed in 1989 by Nuclear Holocausto Vengeance (Marko Laiho), Black Jesus (Arjo Wennström) and Sodomatic Slaughter (Jari Pirinen), with the purpose of performing "the most primitive, savage, hell-obsessed black metal imaginable". "Beherit" is the Syriac word for Satan. Through the uncommercial nature of their music, visuals, and live performances, the band quickly attracted a cult following. Besides the "raw" sound, the band's music is noted for its avant-garde side and emphasis on atmosphere. Beherit are now regarded as a pioneer in their genre.

As a full band, Beherit released one full-length album and many demos and compilations of raw and minimalistic black metal. They disbanded soon after the release of the experimental 1993 album Drawing Down the Moon, which is now considered a classic of the genre. Laiho, the group's frontman, continued as a solo project and released two more albums under the band's name, H418ov21.C in 1994 and Electric Doom Synthesis in 1995. These albums are usually categorized as dark ambient. Although they were completely electronic, the albums carried the atmosphere of the band's black metal recordings. Original members Nuclear Holocausto and Sodomatic Slaughter reformed the band in 2008, now a four-piece featuring new members Ancient Corpse Desekrator and Abyss.

History

Early days (1989–1990)
Beherit was formed in 1989 by three young musicians from Rovaniemi, Lapland; vocalist and guitarist Nuclear Holocausto Vengeance (Marko Laiho), bassist Daemon Fornication and drummer Sodomatic Slaughter (Jari Pirinen). The band released three demos the following year—Seventh Blasphemy, Morbid Rehearsals, and Demonomancy—and also gathered reputation for their live shows, which included pig heads and goats on stage.

The Oath of Black Blood (1991–1992)
Beherit's compilation album, The Oath of Black Blood, includes material recorded from June to September 1990. The album was released in 1991. The album is traditional, fast, and brutal old school black metal, heavily influenced by death metal, thrash metal, and grindcore. However, it is not a separately recorded studio album. The band got some funding for recording an album from their record label at the time, Turbo Music, but supposedly spent the money on alcohol. The label then released their demo Demonomancy and 7-inch EP Dawn of Satan's Millennium as a compilation, without the band's permission, and named it The Oath of Black Blood, which was originally supposed to be the name of the new album. Laiho commented on the album in an early 1992 interview for Metal Hammer magazine:

"I hate the album! It's so bad, we never wanted to release it. The songs are from our 'Demonomancy' demo and our label Turbo Music just used a regular cassette for the album pressing. Honestly, I never sent them the master tape... We're planning to release a proper LP soon, this time on my own label. The result should be much better."

The album is now generally regarded as a full-length release. Spinefarm Records re-issued it in 2005, and Season of Mist in 2006. In 1991, the band members briefly performed under the name, The Lord Diabolus, from which a single demo tape was made and released independently before the band returned to working under the name Beherit. The songs "Intro (Tireheb)" and "Nocturnal Evil" were later re-released as Beherit songs.

Drawing Down the Moon (1993)
Beherit's best-known and most influential album, Drawing Down the Moon, was recorded between April and August in 1992. It was released in 1993 as the band's first official LP. The album was named after a Wiccan ritual, "drawing down the Moon". The album was highly experimental within the black metal scene, as the band used whispers and space-like electronic and synth sounds to strengthen its hypnotic atmosphere. Drawing Down the Moon was reissued by Candlelight Records in 2006.

Ambient era (1994–1996)
Despite the album's success, Drawing Down the Moon was to remain the band's last black metal release, as they split up the next year. Laiho still recorded two albums of dark ambient music, H418ov21.C and Electric Doom Synthesis, and released them under the band's name. As the band did not reform and Laiho had eventually lost interest in black metal, he went on to continue his musical career in dark ambient as Suuri Shamaani and in hardcore techno as DJ Gamma-G.

Return to black metal, Engram (2009)

Beherit was reformed in 2008, with original members Nuclear Holocausto (having returned to Finland from Thailand) and Sodomatic Slaughter, and newcomers Ancient Corpse Desekrator and Abyss. The new album is a return to the black metal genre, and also marks Beherit's return to a full band configuration after existing as a solo project from 1994 until its disbandment in 1996. The album, entitled Engram, is the band's third black metal album (fifth overall) and first in 14 years.

A sixth album, Bardo Exist was released in 2020. This album marked a return to the black ambient style.

Conflicts
Beherit were one of the first second-wave black metal bands. In the early 1990s, but due to Beherit and groups such as Impaled Nazarene and Barathrum, the Finnish scene was becoming more and more recognized. This eventually resulted in a Norwegian-Finnish conflict often named the "Dark War". According to Isten fanzine's obviously satirical article, the conflict originated from several misunderstandings and practical jokes, involving Laiho, but Mika Luttinen of Impaled Nazarene believed he received death threats in Norwegian. His band's first album had a statement saying "no orders from Norway accepted", which Luttinen later admitted to be stupid and childish. Laiho commented on the conflict in an interview for January 1994 issue of Masters of Brutality magazine:

"When we started the band about 4 years ago we knew this and so that's okay. Now there are more people against us ‘cause of these new rules and all these stupid rumours spread by our Norwegian enemies... but I don’t care so much. But that’s a bit sad that the black metal underground scene is totally split."

Band members

Current members
 Nuclear Holocausto (Marko Laiho) (Black Crucifixion) – vocals, guitars, keyboards, programming (1989–1996, 2008–present)
 Sodomatic Slaughter (Jari Pirinen) (Black Crucifixion) – drums (1989–1993, 2008–present)
 Ancient Corpse Desekrator (Sami Tenetz) (Thy Serpent) – guitars (2008–present)
 Abyss – bass (2008–present)

Former members 
 Daemon Fornication (Demon Fornication) – bass
 Black Jesus (Arjo Wennström) (Painflow) – bass
 Kimmo Luttinen (Catamenia, Impaled Nazarene, The Black League) – drums

Discography

Albums
Drawing Down the Moon (1993)
H418ov21.C (1994)
Electric Doom Synthesis (1995)
Engram (2009)
At the Devil's Studio 1990 (2011)
Bardo Exist (2020)

Compilations
The Oath of Black Blood (1991)
Beast of Beherit - Complete Worxxx (1999)

EPs and demos
Seventh Blasphemy (1990)
Morbid Rehearsals (1990)
Demonomancy (1990)
Dawn of Satan's Millennium (1990)
Diabolus Down There (alternately, Down There..., released under the band name The Lord Diabolus, 1991)
Unreleased Studio Tracks (1991)
Promo 1992 (1992)
Messe des morts (1994)
Celebrate the Dead (2012)

Splits
Beherit / Death Yell (1991)
Messe des morts / Angel Cunt (1999) (with Archgoat)

References

External links
 Beherit at Spinefarm Records

Dark ambient music groups
Finnish black metal musical groups
Musical groups established in 1989
Musical groups disestablished in 1996
Musical groups reestablished in 2008
Musical quartets